Sounds and Visions is the second studio album by The Earl Klugh Trio released in 1993. In this release, the Trio (Earl Klugh on guitar, Ralphe Armstrong on bass, Gene Dunlap on drums) is joined by the London Philharmonic Orchestra conducted by Grammy award winner Don Sebesky. The album features movie themes preceded by short orchestral interludes.

Track listing 
"Prelude" - 0:38
"Goldfinger" - 4:55
"Orchestra Intro" - 1:13
"Maybe September (From the Motion Picture The Oscar)" - 3:22
"Orchestra Intro" - 1:11
"Theme from The Cincinnati Kid" - 4:55
"Orchestra Intro" - 0:49
"Secret Love (From the Motion Picture Calamity Jane)" - 6:58
"Jo Ann's Song (From the Motion Picture Tequila Sunrise)" - 5:27
"Now We're One (From the Motion Picture Truck Turner)" - 5:19
"Interlude in E" - 0:41
"Barefoot in the Park" - 3:36
"Orchestra Intro" - 0:29
"His Eyes, Her Eyes (From the Motion Picture The Thomas Crown Affair)" - 4:36
"Love Theme from The Carpetbaggers" - 5:14
"Interlude in F" - 0:34
"Theme from The Deadly Affair" - 3:49
"Postlude" - 1:07

Charts

References 

1993 albums
Earl Klugh albums
Albums conducted by Don Sebesky
Warner Records albums